Agama aculeata, the ground agama, is a species of lizard from the family Agamidae, found in most of sub-Saharan Africa (Namibia, Botswana, Zimbabwe, South Africa, Mozambique, Southern Angola, Tanzania, Zambia, Eswatini).

Description
Snout-to-vent length is 76–100 mm. With a triangular head and rounded snout, this agama is coloured olive to reddish-brown (sometimes grey or yellowish) with a light creamy-white to pink belly. There are four or five paired darker blotches on the back—many smaller blotches continue down the tail. Breeding males become blue on the sides of their heads.

References

 

aculeata
Agamid lizards of Africa
Reptiles described in 1820
Taxa named by Blasius Merrem